Walter Kutschmann (24 July 1914 – 30 August 1986) was a German SS-Untersturmführer and Gestapo officer, a member of an Einsatzkommando, based first in Lwów, Poland (today Lviv, Ukraine), and later in Drohobycz.  He was responsible for the massacre of 1,500 Polish Jews in Lwów, Poland, in the years 1941–42.

Life
Walter Kutschmann was born in Dresden in 1914, the son of a dentist.  In 1928, he joined the Hitler Youth.  In 1932, he enlisted in the Luftwaffe, in which he served until 1936.  He began to study law, but left this career path to join the Condor Legion, loyal to the forces of Francisco Franco in Spain, participating in the Spanish Civil War. There he was later the third secretary of the German Consulate in Cádiz.  Kutschmann was a relative latecomer to the Nazi Party (membership number 7,475,729) and the SS (membership number 404,651).

At the start of the Second World War, he moved to Leipzig, where he joined the SiPo (Security Police) forces commanded by Karl Eberhard Schöngarth.  Kutschmann was promoted to SS-Untersturmführer and was the commanding officer of an Einsatzgruppe that operated in Drohobycz, Poland.  Under his leadership, the Einsatzgruppe carried out the massacre of Lwów professors in 1941.  In 1942, he ordered the murder of 1,500 Polish intellectuals in the Lwów region, in Brzeziny and Podhajce in what is now part of Ukraine.  Witnesses said that the Ukrainians who were ordered to dig the graves for the killings were themselves later slain on Kutschmann's orders.  Witnesses also claim that Kutschmann shot a 17 or 18-year-old Jewish housemaid in Drohobycz in 1941, after he accused her of having transmitted a venereal disease to him.  In 1944, on the orders of intelligence officer Hans Günther von Dincklage, he was transferred to Paris, where he was briefly associated with Coco Chanel during Operation Modellhut. While in France at the end of 1944, Kutschmann defected to seek refuge in Vigo, Spain under the guise of a Carmelite monk named Pedro Ricardo Olmo Andrés, residing in Vigo.

Post-war
When the French government began to investigate Nazi fugitives in 1947, he sought protection in the ODESSA network and traveled by sea on the MV Monte Amboto, under the guise of a Catholic monk, arriving in Argentina on 16 January 1948.  He was hired by Osram, a lighting manufacturer, where he served as purchasing manager. There in August 1973, he married Geralda Baeumler, an Argentinian citizen of German origin, a businesswoman and a veterinarian.  They settled in the resort town of Miramar, in the southern region of Buenos Aires Province.

Kutschmann lived there until January 1975, when he was found and exposed by journalist Alfredo Serra.  Renowned Nazi hunter Simon Wiesenthal in Vienna arranged the extradition of Kutschmann.  In 1975, after checking Kutschmann's citizenship and marriage, which proved false, Interpol requested his arrest.  The Argentine government attempted to arrest him, but he escaped, thus losing his trail.  In 1975, his Argentine citizenship was revoked.  A second extradition request was made in 1985, and he was again arrested by Interpol agents in the town of Vicente López, in the Greater Buenos Aires. Given his precarious health, he was kept in a hospital prison in Buenos Aires, where he died of a heart attack in 1986 before he could be extradited. His wife was reported to the authorities for animal abuse, specifically for euthanizing homeless dogs in gas chambers.

The Anti-Defamation League provided information contributing to the capture of Walter Kutschmann in 1985. The ADL provided identifying information regarding his scars from the Spanish Civil War, his tattoos, and his blood type.

Had he been extradited, Walter Kutschmann would have been the first Nazi war criminal handed over by Argentina.

References

1914 births
1986 deaths
Condor Legion personnel
Einsatzgruppen personnel
Gestapo personnel
Holocaust perpetrators in Poland
Luftwaffe personnel
Nazis in South America
Military personnel from Dresden
SS-Untersturmführer
People from Buenos Aires Province
Deserters
Hitler Youth members